Kesaria is a village in East Champaran district in the Indian state of Bihar.

Demographics
As of 2011 India census, Kesaria had a population of 5880 in 1001 households. Males constitute 51.78% of the population and females 48.21%. Kesaria has an average literacy rate of 40.49%, lower than the national average of 74%: male literacy is 63.5%, and female literacy is 36.4%. In Kesaria, 22.43% of the population is under 6 years of age.

References

Villages in West Champaran district